Hradec nad Svitavou is a municipality and village in Svitavy District in the Pardubice Region of the Czech Republic. It has about 1,700 inhabitants.

Notable people
Engelmar Unzeitig (1911–1945), German priest

References

Villages in Svitavy District